Hans-Rudolf Schneider (born 3 February 1956) is a Swiss sports shooter. He competed at the 1988 Summer Olympics and the 1992 Summer Olympics.

References

1956 births
Living people
Swiss male sport shooters
Olympic shooters of Switzerland
Shooters at the 1988 Summer Olympics
Shooters at the 1992 Summer Olympics
Place of birth missing (living people)